Hombre is a novel by American author Elmore Leonard, published in 1961. It was adapted into a film in 1967. It tells the story of an Apache man, John Russell, who leads the passengers of an attacked stagecoach through the desert to safety.

The novel was critically acclaimed upon release, and continues to be regarded to the modern day as a classic of the western genre. It was released as a film six years after its publication.

It was adapted in to a film of the same name starring Paul Newman.

References

1961 American novels
Novels by Elmore Leonard
American novels adapted into films
Western (genre) novels
Southwestern United States in fiction
Ballantine Books books